Mahmood Khan (Urdu,; born 30 October 1972) is a Pakistani politician who was the Chief Minister of Khyber Pakhtunkhwa from August 2018 till January 2023 and a member of the Pakistan Tehreek-e-Insaf (PTI). He had been a member of the Provincial Assembly of Khyber Pakhtunkhwa from August 2018 till January 2023, when he, as Chief Minister, dissolved the Assembly.

Previously, he was a Member of the Provincial Assembly of Khyber Pakhtunkhwa, from May 2013 to May 2018. During his first tenure as member of the Khyber Pakhtunkhwa Assembly, he served as Provincial Minister for Khyber Pakhtunkhwa in the provincial cabinet of Chief Minister Pervez Khattak between 2013 and 2018 with various portfolios.

Early life and education
He was born on 30 October 1972 in Matta, Swat Pakistan.

He received his early education from Government Primary School Matta and completed his high school education from Peshawar Public School and College .

He has a degree of Master of Science  (Hons) in Agriculture which he obtained from the University of Peshawar. According to some sources, he obtained his master's degree from the Agricultural University Peshawar.

Political career

According to The Express Tribune and Dawn, Khan was elected as Union Council Nazim of Kharerai, Matta Tehsil in 2005. According to another report by Dawn, he was elected to the same office in 2008 and according to another report by The Express Tribune, he served as Union Council Nazim of Kharerai from 2007 to 2012.

Khan quit Pakistan Peoples Party (PPP) and joined Pakistan Tehreek-e-Insaf (PTI) in 2012.

He was elected to the Provincial Assembly of Khyber Pakhtunkhwa as a candidate of PTI from Constituency PK-84 Swat-V in 2013 Pakistani general election. He received 11,071 votes and defeated a candidate of Awami National Party. In June 2013, he was inducted into the Khyber Pakhtunkhwa provincial cabinet of Chief Minister Pervez Khattak and was appointed as Provincial Minister of Khyber Pakhtunkhwa for Sports, Culture, Tourism and Museums.

Khan made national news in April 2014, when a social activist Shakil Wahidullah filed a petition against him in the Peshawar High Court alleging him of corruption of Rs 1.8 million during his tenure as Provincial Minister for Sports, Culture, Tourism and Museums. Following which an inquiry was conducted by the Government of Khyber Pakhtunkhwa to probe the matter. The inquiry officer noted that Khan had no role in the matter. It was noted that Rs 1.8 million were transferred from the Directorate of Sports to Khan's personal bank account on his directive. Khan had also acknowledged it but said it had happened due to misunderstanding, While Khan was exonerated by the inquiry officer, saying the handling of financial affairs falls within the jurisdiction of the principal accounts officer and his staff. He was removed from the cabinet and subsequently his ministerial portfolio was withdrawn on the orders of Peshawar High Court, along with suspension of three senior officers of the sports department.

In July 2014, he was re-inducted into the provincial cabinet of Chief Minister Pervez Khattak and appointed as Provincial Minister of Khyber Pakhtunkhwa for Irrigation where he continued to serve until October 2014. In January 2016, he was appointed as Provincial Minister of Khyber Pakhtunkhwa for Home and Tribal Affairs in the Khyber Pakhtunkhwa provincial cabinet of Chief Minister Pervez Khattak. In February 2016, his ministerial portfolio was changed from Home and Tribal Affairs to sports, culture, archaeology, museums and youth affairs where he continued to serve until the dissolution of the provincial assembly on 29 May 2018 upon the completion of the government's five-year term.

He was re-elected to the Provincial Assembly of Khyber Pakhtunkhwa as a candidate of PTI from Constituency PK-9 (Swat-VIII) in 2018 Pakistani general election. He received 25,630 votes and defeated Muhammad Ayub Khan, a candidate of Awami National Party (ANP). PTI acquired a two-thirds majority during the general election in the Provincial Assembly of Khyber Pakhtunkhwa. Following Khan's successful election, Pervez Khattak recommended his name for the office of the Chief Minister of Khyber Pakhtunkhwa. In August 2018, PTI formally nominated him for the same office. Reportedly, Imran Khan preferred to select Atif Khan for the office of Khyber Pakhtunkhwa Chief Ministership however had to select Khan due to the strong reservations by Pervez Khattak over the latter's selection. It was noted that his appointment as Khyber Pakhtunkhwa Chief Minister was political and not on merit, and that a tussle between Atif Khan and Pervez Khattak paved his way to become PTI candidate for the slot of Chief Minister. Khan became the first person from Malakand Division to be nominated for the position of Khyber Pakhtunkhwa Chief Minister.

On 16 August 2018, he was elected Chief Minister of Khyber Pakhtunkhwa. He received 77 votes against his opponent Mian Nisar Gul who secured 33 votes. The next day, he sworn in as Chief Minister of Khyber Pakhtunkhwa.

Cabinet
After assuming the office as the Chief Minister, Khan held consultation with Imran Khan and  formed an 11-member cabinet. The 11-member cabinet sworn in on 29 August 2018. The second part of his cabinet, consisting of two advisors and two special assistants was sworn in on 13 September 2018 increasing the size of the cabinet to 15.

Dissolution of the 11th Provincial Assembly 
On 17 January 2023, Khan sent a letter to Governor Haji Ghulam Ali, advising him to dissolve the Provincial Assembly. The Governor accepted the advice the next day, effectively calling snap elections across Khyber Pakhtunkhwa.

He ceased to be Chief Minister on 21 January 2023 after the appointment of Muhammad Azam Khan, a bureaucrat, as the caretaker Chief Minister.

Personal wealth
As of August 2018, Khan declared to own 89 kanals of agricultural land and 150 shops in Swat's Matta Bazaar worth Rs2.516 billion.

References

Living people
Khyber Pakhtunkhwa MPAs 2013–2018
1972 births
Pakistan Tehreek-e-Insaf MPAs (Khyber Pakhtunkhwa)
Khyber Pakhtunkhwa MPAs 2018–2023
Chief Ministers of Khyber Pakhtunkhwa
People from Swat District